Hylax is a genus of leaf beetles in the subfamily Eumolpinae. It is distributed in Central America and South America.

The species Hylax bahiensis was recorded attacking clonal eucalyptus plantations and forest restoration areas between 2010 and 2013 in the states of Espírito Santo, Bahia and Minas Gerais in Brazil.

Species

 Hylax aeneus (Lefèvre, 1878)
 Hylax apollodorus Bechyné, 1955
 Hylax analectus Bechyné, 1951
 Hylax bahiensis Bechyné, 1950
 Hylax bolivianus (Jacoby, 1882)
 Hylax calcaratus (Chapuis, 1874)
 Hylax calcaratus chalcaratus (Chapuis, 1874)
 Hylax calcaratus vianai (Bechyné, 1949)
 Hylax chalybaeus (Lefèvre, 1878)
 Hylax chiriquiensis (Jacoby, 1900)
 Hylax chrysodinoides Bechyné, 1951
 Hylax continuus (Bechyné, 1949)
 Hylax coroicensis Bechyné, 1950
 Hylax coroicensis coroicensis Bechyné, 1950
 Hylax coroicensis subcorpulentus Bechyné, 1958
 Hylax costaricensis Bechyné, 1951
 Hylax cupreus (Olivier, 1791)
 Hylax cyanipes (Lefèvre, 1884)
 Hylax dilatipes (Bowditch, 1921)
 Hylax dimidiata (Jacoby, 1900)
 Hylax elongatus (Lefèvre, 1884)
 Hylax ferox (Baly, 1865)
 Hylax flavipes (Lefèvre, 1885)
 Hylax guerini Bechyné, 1953
 Hylax hilaris (Lefèvre, 1884)
 Hylax humeralis (Baly, 1860)
 Hylax hoegei (Jacoby, 1890)
 Hylax klugi (Lefèvre, 1884)
 Hylax lateralis (Germar, 1824)
 Hylax marcapatensis Bechyné, 1955
 Hylax mexicanus (Jacoby, 1881)
 Hylax mutabilis (Lefèvre, 1878)
 Hylax nigroviolaceus (Jacoby, 1900)
 Hylax pereirai Bechyné, 1958
 Hylax peruanus (Lefèvre, 1895)
 Hylax plagiatus (Lefèvre, 1878)
 Hylax pseudoviolaceus Bechyné, 1953
 Hylax puncticollis (Jacoby, 1890)
 Hylax quadriplagiatus (Jacoby, 1881)
 Hylax romani (Weise, 1921)
 Hylax rufimanus (Lefèvre, 1878)
 Hylax rufotestaceus (Lefèvre, 1878)
 Hylax rugulosus (Lefèvre, 1882)
 Hylax rutilans (Lefèvre, 1885)
 Hylax spinipes (Latreille, 1832)
 Hylax strigatus (Lefèvre, 1884)
 Hylax strigicollis (Jacoby, 1890)
 Hylax tarsalis (Lefèvre, 1885)
 Hylax tenebrosus (Jacoby, 1890)
 Hylax viridis (Bowditch, 1921)
 Hylax wygodzinskyi Bechyné, 1950
 Hylax zikani (Bechyné, 1949)

The following species were moved to Hermesia:
 Hylax auratus (Olivier, 1808)
 Hylax auratus violaceus (Jacoby, 1882): synonym of Hermesia inermis Bowditch, 1921
 Hylax cyaneus (Bowditch, 1921)

Other synonyms:
 Hylax lateralis (Lefèvre, 1878): synonym of Chalcoplacis plicipennis (Germar, 1824)

References

Eumolpinae
Chrysomelidae genera
Beetles of Central America
Beetles of South America
Taxa named by Édouard Lefèvre